Judith St. George was the 21st High Commissioner of Canada to Malaysia, replacing Randolph Mank and succeeded by Julia Bentley.  St. George was Consul General in Vietnam from 2000 - 2003.

St. George earned a BA in History from Queen's University (1980) and a MA in Public Administration from Carleton University (1982).

References

Living people
Canadian women ambassadors
High Commissioners of Canada to Malaysia
Consuls
Queen's University at Kingston alumni
Carleton University alumni
Year of birth missing (living people)